Canto livre is a kind of music with roots in Alentejo music, predominantly inspired by political messages, in particular from left-wing thinkers. It was very common after the 1974 carnation revolution in Portugal since the country had liberated from an almost 40-year right-wing dictatorship. Currently, it is not heard much, although the term "canto livre" can also mean a gathering of singers which perform freely without charging for their show.

External links
Book on canto livre
Music genres